Merrilees may refer to

 Merrilees Parker (born 1971), British television presenter
 Duncan Merrilees (1922–2009), Australian geologist, palaeontologist and lecturer
 Kieran Merrilees (born 1989), Scottish badminton player
 Meg Merrilees, fictional character in Guy Mannering (1815)
 Peta Merrilees (born 1982), Australian cricketer
 William Merrilees (1898–1984), Scottish policeman